Meyeti Ekhon Kothay Jabe is a 2017 Bangladeshi drama film directed by Nader Chowdhury, written by Imdadul Hoque Milon. The film received the Bangladesh National Film Awards in 2016 in 4 categories.

Cast
 Shah Riaz as Raaj
 Falguni Rahman Jolly
 Fazlur Rahman Babu
 Raisul Islam Asad
 Mamunur Rashid

Soundtrack
"Moner Moddhe Pakhna Meila" - Dolly Sayontoni
"Ami Jochhona Dekhi Purnimate" - Sabina Yasmin, N/A

Awards
 Bangladesh National Film Awards 2016
 Best Actor in Supporting Role – Fazlur Rahman Babu
 Best Music Director – Emon Saha
 Best Music Composer – Emon Saha
 Best Lyricist – Gazi Mazharul Anwar

References

External links
 

2017 films
Bengali-language Bangladeshi films
Bangladeshi drama films
2010s Bengali-language films
2017 drama films
Films scored by Emon Saha
Jaaz Multimedia films